Bernardino I da Polenta (died November 14, 1359) was lord of Ravenna and Cervia from 1346 until his death.

He was the son of Ostasio I da Polenta. In 1346 he inherited the family lordships together with his brothers Pandolfo and Lamberto II. The following year Bernardino had both of them imprisoned in Cervia after one year, where they died of starvation.

He died in 1359 after a tranquil reign and was succeeded by his son Guido.

See also
Da Polenta family

1359 deaths
Bernardino 1
14th-century Italian nobility
Year of birth unknown
Lords of Ravenna